Kuruluş: Osman 
() is a Turkish historical drama television series created by Mehmet Bozdağ and starring Burak Özçivit as the main protagonist. It focuses on the life of Osman I, the founder of the Ottoman Empire.

Plot 
The TV show includes Osman Ghazi's internal and external struggles and how he establishes and controls the Ottoman Empire. It portrays his struggles against Byzantium and the Mongol Ilkhanate and how he was able to secure independence from the Sultanate of Rum to establish a sovereign state that would stand up to the Byzantine and Mongol Empire and would honour the Turks.

The character of Osman faces many enemies and traitors in his quest and the show illustrates how he was able to overcome these obstacles and fulfil his mission with the help of his loyal companions, family, and friends.

Predecessor 

The series follows Diriliş: Ertuğrul which was situated around Osman's father, Ertuğrul, and how he faced enemies and traitors. It began in December 2014 and season 5 of the show concluded with Ertuğrul convincing Berke to start a war with Hulagu Khan. This war was known as the Berke-Hulagu war and resulted in the division of the Mongol Empire into four khanates. In Kuruluş: Osman, Osman faces one of the khanates called the Ilkhanate.

Season 1 

10 or 15 years after the Berke-Hulagu war, Ertuğrul Ghazi goes to Konya and he leaves his brother, Dündar Bey, in charge of his tribe. Dündar Bey is easily swayed by others into doing their misdeeds, he falls into the trap of the devious Selçuk Sançak Bey Alişar, and the merciless princess of Kulucahisar, Sofia, who seeks to kill all the Turks. Osman, Dündar's nephew, can see through Alişar and Sofia's plans and warns him about them, despite his refusal to listen. As they continue to build more tension against the Kayı, Geyhatu sends Komutan Balgay to cause more trouble and stop the Kayı, especially Osman, from rebelling against the Mongols. Dündar, who bows down to the Mongols becoming the Sançak Bey, can't see Alişar's anger over his position being given over to him and he believes him when Alişar blames Osman for his son's killing. Soon after, along with the threat from Kulucahisar, Dündar is shown the truth, Alişar is beheaded by Osman, and Osman has married his love at first sight, Bala. Following this, after many difficulties, Balgay is presumably killed by Osman while Kulucahisar is conquered by the Kayı with Sofia's death happening in the process.

Season 2 

Aya Nikola is sent by the Byzantine Emperor, Andronikos II to become the new Tekfur of İnegöl followed by Ertuğrul's return in the tribe. Meanwhile, Yavlak Arslan, the new Uç Bey, seeks to create his state and sees Osman as an obstacle, later on, they unite against the new threat created by the Mongol Governor of Anatolia, Geyhatu who allies with Nikola against the Turks of Anatolia. Nikola recaptures Kulaca Hisar by poisoning the alps. Bala also faces the arrival of Targun, Nikola's spy who allies with Osman to save her father, İnal Bey. Along with these problems, Osman is elected as the new Bey after his father's death, whilst he decides to marry a second wife according to his father's will. After Targun's death, Osman meets Malhun Hatun and initiates a major battle with the Byzantines, historically known as the Battle of Mount Armenia, as well as trying to find the traitor in the Kayı, as his jealous uncle Dündar helps the Byzantines stir traps for him. Dündar is eventually executed by Osman for his betrayal. Osman then initiates a major battle with the Byzantines, with the support of Malhun Hatun which is historically known as the Battle of Domanic . Following the arrival of Ömer Bey, father of Malhun Hatun  Geyhatu sends Kara Şaman Togay, son of Baycu Noyan, to eliminate both Osman's Kayı and Ömer's Bayındır, but after a series of conflicts between the two tribes, Togay fails and is killed by Osman. Nikola is later defeated by Osman, with the support of Seljuk Sultan Mesud II, though he survives. Osman also marries Malhun Hatun in a political marriage, who gives birth to Osman's son Orhan whilst his first wife Bala Hatun becomes pregnant.

Season 3 
Malhun Hatun learns of Bala Hatun's pregnancy and engages in power struggle with her, though they soon resolve their differences. Osman Bey faces Harmankaya Tekfur Mikhael Kosses (Köse Mihal) and Bilecik Tekfur Rogatus Laskaris for Papaz Gregor, a priest who was imprisoned by Byzantine Emperor and he later escaped with help of Tekfur Rogatus. Howevever, Gregor is caught and executed by Osman after he attempted to cause an explosion in Söğüt. Turgut Bey is a vailiant Turk Bey who opposes the Byzantines and later allies with Osman Bey, becoming his close friend and right-hand man.

Osman has conflicts again with his old enemy Tekfur Aya Nikola who is helped by the Catalan Company, though Osman soon defeats the Catalans. Tekfur Nikola wants to marry Mari, sister of Mikhail Kosses, who in turn has fallen in love with Turgut Bey. She escapes the forced alliance and soon with her brother's blessings marries Turgut Bey. Meanwhile, a Vizier of the Seljuk Empire, Alemşah arrives to deal with Osman, thinking of him as a threat to his political ambitions. He is soon joined by his ally, Geyhatu. Alemşah attempts to create a rift between Osman and Sultan Mesud, however Osman soon executes Alemşah and proves his innocence to Mesud. In the ensuing conflict, Rogatus is killed. Meanwhile Geyhatu is captured and sent to his brother, Ilkhan Argun, who imprisons him for his treachery, though Geyhatu eventually becomes Ilkhan after Argun's death. Osman Bey and Bala Hatun are blessed with a baby boy who is named Alaeddin Ali. Osman then has to face Nikola's mentor, the dangerous cult leader, Arius, who arrives in Söğüt in the disguise of a Shiekh. Arius' scheming results in the deaths of Mari, Umur Bey and Umur's brother Ivaz Bey's deaths. 

Several years later, in 1299, Selcan Hatun dies due to an illness. Osman launches a series of conquests, conquering Bilecik, İnegöl and Yenisehir, executing Arius and Nikola. Kosses, who was Osman's ally ever since his conflict with Alemşah accepts Islam and goes to spy in Bursa.

Season 4 
In Constantinople, one of the heirs to the Byzantine throne, Kantakuzenos tries to assassinate Andronikos and become emperor. However, Osman comes to know of this plan through his spies in the city and saves Andronikos' life. Infuriated at this failure, Kantakuzenos alongside his ally Olof (a Byzantine commander of Viking descent). Together, they frame Öktem Bey (one of Osman subordinate Beys) and his daughter Alcicek. However, Osman foils their plans and proves both of their innocence. Meanwhile, Alcicek and Aktemur (Gunduz's son, Osman's nephew and the Subaşi of Yenişehir) fall in love.

Osman conquers Marmara Hisar (in present-day Marmaracık). Bayindir Bey of the Çavuldur tribe (another subordinate Bey of Osman, who participated in this conquest) gets his share of the loot from the conquest late, which infuriates him and causes him to complain about Osman to Ismihan Sultan, mother of Sultan Alaeddin Kayqubad III, the current Seljuk Sultan. Concerned by Osman's growing influence, Ismihan arrives at Yenişehir ,allying with Kantakuzenos, Olof and Bayindir to take down Osman. Meanwhile Osman decides to reinstate Alaeddin's uncle, the deposed Sultan Mesud as Sultan. Ismihan causes great harm to Osman, spreading a plague in Yenişehir and nearly killing him. However, Osman spoils all of her plans, executing Kantakuzenos. In the ensuing confict, he also executes a Mongol commander, Samagar. Angered, Samagar's superior commander Nayman demands blood money and Osman's head as compensation for his death. However, Osman refused to back down and prepares to fight Nayman's huge army, attempting to ally with the Germiyanid, Karasid and Candarid beyliks.

Episodes

Cast and characters 

 Burak Özçivit as Osman Bey; Osman (also referred to as "Kara Osman") is the third and youngest son of Ertuğrul Ghazi and Halime Hatun. He is also the younger brother of Gündüz Bey and Savcı Bey, and nephew of Selcan Hatun, whom he treats as his own mother. He is the husband of Bala Hatun and Malhun Hatun and the father of Orhan, Alaeddin Ali, Fatma Hatun and Halime Hatun who aspires to follow in the footsteps of his father Ertuğrul and his grandfather Süleyman Şah. He is extremely attentive to his surroundings and good with a sword, just like his father. He disobeys his beys sometimes, travelling on the path he believes is successful. His weakness is his care for his close ones, making him prone to traps. He humiliates his enemies both on the battlefield and while negotiating, leaving them with a thirst for revenge. He is elected as the Bey of his tribe in season 2. He decides to marry a second wife as per his father's will, as well as changing the Kayi flag. Based on Osman I.

 Özge Törer as Bala Hatun; Bala is the daughter of Şeyh Edebali and Ulduz Hatun, who died because of a disease. She is Osman Bey's first wife, mother of Alaeddin Ali and Halime Hatun and a beautiful painter having been best friends with Gonca Hatun. She is the Chief Lady of the Kayi Tribe and Yenişehir and the Head of the Bacıyân-ı Rûm. She is loyal to her father, the Ahi brotherhood and Selcan Hatun. She is extremely calm and patient but is prone to heartbreak. A Mongol stabbed her in season 1 and she therefore cannot produce a baby, and is constantly teased due to this fact. In season 2, after her husband is elected Bey, she becomes the Hanım(Head Hatun) of the Kayı tribe, succeeding Selcan Hatun. She is upset when Osman decides to marry a second wife, but accepts her fate. Eventually becomes pregnant. Gives birth to Osman's second son Alaeddin Ali. Two months after the victory of İnegöl, Bala is revealed to be pregnant with Osman's fourth child and soon gives birth to a daughter named Halime after her paternal grandmother. She is the most powerful woman of the Kayı tribe, and continues to pledge her loyalty to her husband Osman at all times. Based on Rabia Bala Hatun.

  as Boran Alp; Boran is one of Osman Bey's main alps and his best friend. A close companion of Konur and later Göktuğ, Dumrul, Gence Bey and Cerkutay. He is the widower of Gonca Hatun. He is a talented bard and singer. He uses a sword while being skilled in archery, and often also uses a bow and arrow in close combat.

 Burak Çelik as Göktug Alp Göktug (formerly Kongar) was one of Osman Bey's main alps. He was formerly Balgay's right-hand man and adoptive son, and Konur Alp's long lost younger brother. He became a "Mankurt" (brainwashed Mongol) after his tribe was raided after which he was given to a slave trader. He reverted to Islam after he saw a letter from the Emperor confirming Balgay had bought him from the slave market. He was recaptured by Balgay who again brainwashed him with the use of his shaman. After killing his brother, the devastated Göktug reverted to Islam once again. He became the Alpbaşı of the Kayı tribe after Osman became the Bey. He returned from his fake exile as Osman's spy on Nikola and Targun. He later helped Bala escape and kill Targun and reunited with Osman. After Targun's death, he became the leader of the Cuman Turks. He was killed by Geyhatu for revenge after he is taken by Vezir Alemshah and Nikola. Not to be confused with Diriliş: Ertuğrul's Göktuğ.

 Yıldız Çağrı Atiksoy as Malhun Hatun;  Malhun is the daughter of Ömer Bey, hanim of bayindir tribe, second wife of Osman Bey, the mother of Orhan and Fatma. She belonged to the Bayındır tribe an Oğuz tribe settled in Ankara suffering persecution from Geyhatu. The tribe consists of 10,000 people and seeks to settle in Bithynia on Osman's invitation, which was one of the reasons why Malhun came.She is skilled in archery and combat. She saved Osman Bey from Nikola's attack. Comes from a noble lineage of Beys formerly loyal to the Selçuk State and Sultan Alaeddin Keykubat. In the beginning has tense relations with Bala Hatun while being arrogant due to her father's power. She is sent by her father to examine the western borders of the state. She discovers Dündar's ring in Söğüt, and attempts to find the traitors in the Kayı tribe herself. Later marries Osman Bey in a political marriage, and falls pregnant soon after. Gives birth to osman first child Orhan.She is a brave hatun who supports her husband osman in battlefields and also accomapnies him on his conquests. She is called Devlet Ana. Based on Malhun Hatun . 
 Ragıp Savaş as Dündar Bey; Dündar is the youngest son of Süleyman Şah and Hayme Hatun. The youngest brother of Sungurtekin Bey and Ertuğrul Ghazi, and the youngest adoptive brother of Selcan Hatun. Husband of Hazal Hatun and widower of Zöhre Hatun. Father of Aygül, Batur and Bahadır, adoptive father of Saltuk Alp. Uncle of Gündüz, Savcı and Osman. Is easily swayed by others. He was made substitute Bey while Ertuğrul Ghazi was on a mission in Konya. When the Mongols attacked, he preferred to bow down to them rather than fight, angering those who were close to Osman Bey. Tries to take over Gündüz's Beylik when he became the Bey instead of him and helps the Mongols against Osman Bey. Is manipulated by his wives. He became the Selçuk Sançak Bey, a Selçuk operative figure, for a while after he allied with the Mongols. He later accepts his mistakes and begs for forgiveness but was punished by Ertuğrul and sent out of the tribe for a while into Söğüt. He respects and is loyal to his older brother, Ertuğrul Ghazi. Later in season two, when Ertuğrul is on his death bed, he decides to betray his brother and nephews in order to seize the Kayı Beylik. He is angered when Osman becomes the Bey, collaborating with anyone against Osman. He is eventually executed by Osman for his treachery. Based on Dündar Bey.
  Ilkan Kazimli as Byzantine Commander; He was a heroic commander who died in the fights for the New City.

Production 
The series is written and produced by Mehmet Bozdağ and directed by Metin Günay. The theme music is by Alpay Göktekin (died 5 May 2020) and Zeynep Alasya. It was filmed in Riva, Istanbul and broadcasting of the first season began in November 2019 on ATV. Filming of the third season began in late August 2021 and ended in mid June 2022. The show was renewed for a fourth season and is currently being aired on ATV.

Reception
The show has been well received in Turkey. In December 2019, Kuruluş: Osman attracted record viewership on ATV, in its fourth weekend of broadcast, the 4th episode of the series recorded a countrywide rating of 14.46. Mehmet Bozdağ claims that the show has also been a great success in Albania, where it is called Osmani, and said that it is the "most watched TV show" in the country. In January 2021, the show, which was one of the most popular shows in Turkey, began broadcasting in the Middle East on Noor Play.

In December 2019, Kuruluş: Osman attracted record viewership on ATV in its fourth weekend of broadcast, the 4th episode of the series recorded a countrywide rating of 14.46. Mehmet Bozdağ claimed that the show has also been a great success in Albania and that it is the "most watched TV show" in the country.

The show has been very successful in Pakistan. It currently airs on VidTower in Urdu. Episode 59 broke viewership records in Pakistan. After the series became a huge hit, Pakistan National Assembly Speaker Asad Qaiser visited the set to view the shooting of the series. He also met the leading actor, Burak Özçivit. After Bamsi died in Kurulus Osman, Pakistani fans were left teary-eyed and paid tribute to the drama.

Awards and nominations

See also 

 List of Islam-related films
 Kuruluş "Osmancık", Turkish 1988 TV drama, based on a novel by the same name.

Notes

References

External links 

Kuruluş: Osman on ATV
Kuruluş Osman - official channel on YouTube
Kurulus Osman Season 4 Urdu Subtitles
Kurulus Osman Season 4 Urdu Dubbing
Kuruluş Osman - official english translation channel on KayiFamilyTV

2019 Turkish television series debuts
ATV (Turkey) original programming
Current Turkish television series
 
Television series about couples
Television series about Islam
Television series about the Ottoman Empire
Television series produced in Istanbul
Television series set in the 13th century
Turkish historical television series
Turkish-language television shows
War drama television series